Mieczysław Strzałka (born 20 March 1947) is a Polish gymnast. He competed in eight events at the 1972 Summer Olympics.

References

1947 births
Living people
Polish male artistic gymnasts
Olympic gymnasts of Poland
Gymnasts at the 1972 Summer Olympics
Sportspeople from Bielsko-Biała